Cornelius Adagbada is an Anglican bishop in Nigeria: a former archdeacon, he has been Bishop of Oke-Ogun since 2018.

Notes

Living people
21st-century Anglican bishops in Nigeria
Year of birth missing (living people)
Anglican bishops of Oke-Ogun
Church of Nigeria archdeacons